The 2006–07 Belgian Hockey League season was the 87th season of the Belgian Hockey League, the top level of ice hockey in Belgium. Seven teams participated in the league, and the White Caps Turnhout won the championship.

Regular season

Playoffs

Gerard Sak Cup (5th place)

Semifinal
 Bulldogs de Liege - Haskey Hasselt 2-0 (5-2, 4-6)

Final
Phantoms Deurne - Bulldogs de Liege 2-1 (2-5, 3-2, 1-0)

References
Season on hockeyarchives.info

Belgian Hockey League
Belgian Hockey League seasons
Bel